One Small Step is a 2018 Chinese-American animated short film by Andrew Chesworth and Bobby Pontillas and produced by Taiko Studios.

Summary
Luna is a vibrant young Chinese American girl who dreams of becoming an astronaut. From the day she witnesses a rocket launching into space on TV, Luna is driven to reach for the stars.

Accolades
Nominated: 91st Academy Awards-Academy Award for Best Animated Short Film

See also 
2018 in film
List of female astronauts
Single parenting

References

External links
Homepage
One Small Step on Vimeo

TAIKO Studios official YouTube channel
The entire film on CGMeetup's official YouTube channel

2010s animated short films
2018 animated films
2018 films
2018 short films
American animated short films
Films about Chinese Americans
Chinese animated short films
Films set in San Francisco
Films about astronauts
Moon in film
Animated films without speech
2010s American films